Umbert J. Delotto  (June 21, 1919 - October 16, 1991) served in the California State Assembly for the 32nd district from 1959 to 1963 and during World War II he served in the United States Navy. Delotto died on October 16, 1991, at the age of 72.

References

United States Navy personnel of World War I
1919 births
1991 deaths
20th-century American politicians
Democratic Party members of the California State Assembly